Yugoslav Braille is a family of closely related braille alphabets used for South Slavic languages of former Yugoslavia, namely Serbo-Croatian, Slovene and Macedonian. It is based on the unified international braille conventions, with the letters corresponding to their Latin transliterations.

Alphabet

Punctuation

Unesco reports that Croatian Braille swaps the Serbian quotation marks for parentheses and the period/full stop for the apostrophe, but it's possible that this is due to a copy error; the table below follows Croatian Wikipedia, which agrees with Serbian, for these characters.  There is less punctuation reported for Slovene and Macedonian Braille, but what there is matches Serbian conventions.

Blank cells in the tables are unattested.

Single punctuation:

Paired punctuation:

Formatting

The superscript is reported for Croatian Braille; in Serbian Braille,  is used for the virgule /.  In Slovene Braille, the emphasis (bold/italic) marker  is reported to be an abbreviation sign.

Croatian Wikipedia states that  is used for capital letters.

References

French-ordered braille alphabets
Serbian language
Macedonian language
Croatian language
Slovene language